Benjamin Franklin Hayes (1836-1901) was a judge, state representative, and state senator from Medford, Massachusetts.

Biography
Hayes was born in Berwick, Maine on July 3, 1836, to Frederick and Sarah (Hurd) Hayes, active Free Will Baptists. He attended the New Hampton School and then studied the law for a year with Wade & Eastman in Great Falls, New Hampshire in 1859-60 before entering the Harvard Law School. He was admitted to the Suffolk County, Massachusetts bar in 1861 while still in law school and then worked for Baker & Sullivan in Boston and lived in Medford.

From 1862 to 1873  Hayes served as a Middlesex County trial justice. From 1864 to 1870 he served as assistant U.S. revenue assessor, and from 1868 to 1871 served on the Medford school board. He was elected a state representative from 1872 to 1874; and then state senator from 1878 to 1879. In 1892 he worked on the commission to create and obtain a city charter for Medford, and served as the first city solicitor until his death. Starting in 1869 he served as a trustee and board member of Medford Savings bank and later president starting in 1899. He also served in the Lawrence Rifles militia. His brothers Frederick Hayes and Dr. John Alfred Hayes, a surgeon, were notable Civil War veterans.

Benjamin Franklin Hayes died at his home in Medford on January 31, 1901.

See also
 1872 Massachusetts legislature
 1873 Massachusetts legislature
 1874 Massachusetts legislature
 1878 Massachusetts legislature

References

People from Medford, Massachusetts
Harvard Law School alumni
1836 births
1901 deaths
Massachusetts state senators
Massachusetts state court judges
New Hampton School alumni